Juan Muñoz (1907 – 1 September 1972) was a Spanish boxer. He competed in the men's featherweight event at the 1928 Summer Olympics. In his first fight, he lost to Bep van Klaveren of the Netherlands.

References

1907 births
1972 deaths
Spanish male boxers
Olympic boxers of Spain
Boxers at the 1928 Summer Olympics
Boxers from Barcelona
Featherweight boxers